Gianni Palmese (born 5 March 1999) is an Italian football player. He plays for Sammaurese Calcio.

Club career

Genoa

Loan to Lucchese
On 31 July 2018, he joined Lucchese on loan for the 2018–19 season.

He made his Serie C debut for Lucchese on 26 December 2018 in a game against Pontedera, as an added-time substitute for Marco De Vito.

Follonica Gavorrano
On 10 August 2019, he joined Serie D club Follonica Gavorrano. He left on 28 November 2019.

International
He was first called up to represent his country on 18 February 2016 for Italy national under-17 football team in a friendly against Serbia.

References

External links
 

1999 births
People from San Giorgio a Cremano
Footballers from Campania
Living people
Italian footballers
Italy youth international footballers
Association football defenders
S.S.D. Lucchese 1905 players
Serie C players
Serie D players